Kaare Hammer (4 June 1918 – 2 May 2006) was a Norwegian racewalker who competed in the 1948 Summer Olympics and in the 1952 Summer Olympics.

References

1918 births
2006 deaths
Norwegian male racewalkers
Olympic athletes of Norway
Athletes (track and field) at the 1948 Summer Olympics
Athletes (track and field) at the 1952 Summer Olympics
20th-century Norwegian people